David Zilpimiani (Georgian: დავით ზილფიმიანი) is a Georgian academic, Member of Parliament of Georgia, radiophysicist and professor.

Education and academic career 

In 1976–1981 years David Zilpimiani graduated Ivane Javakhishvili Tbilisi State University, Department of Physics. Radio Physics and Electronics. At the same time, from 1977 to 1981 he Worked as an engineer in the Semiconductor Laboratory at the department of Physics.

In 1979–2003 David Zilpimiani Worked at the Institute of Geophysics of the Academy of sciences as an Engineer. He was a Head of Laboratory and Head of Seismic Service. In 1985 He Defended the dissertation on „Electromagnetic Processes in the process of Earthquake Preparation". Moscow, Higher Attestation Commission. On the same year, 1985 He accepted the academic Degree – Doctor of physics and Mathematics.

In1992-1993, he received a JISTEC AWARD at the University of Tokyo and worked in Mogi Laboratory as a research fellow together with the professor Honaka. After this, from 1994 to 2006 he was a professor at the University of Rome, Department of Physics. From 1998 to 2003 he was a Professor at the University of Athens.

In 2000–2003 years he was a Chief Scientists and Systems Engineer of the Esperia Project at the Italian Space Agency. In 2003–2005 he founded Georgian Space research Agency together with the Academician Jumber Lominadze and became the Deputy Director of this Agency. At the same time, 2003–2004 he worked as a co-author of the project LAZIO-SIRAD implemented at the International Space Station (ISS).

In 2004–2008 years, he was a co-author of the project EGLE of the European Space Agency.

From 2011 to 2012 he worked with the professor Patrick Taylor at NASA’s Goddard Space Flight Center (Maryland, US) on a new low orbit satellite project. In 2011, he became a Head of the Georgian Space Research Agency.

In 2016 – up to present he is a academician of the National Academy. Full Member.

Professional and business career 
In 1994 he founded the first private broadcaster „I Radio". After 3 years, in 1997 he founded the TV Company „I STEREO". In 2002 he founded of the Broadcasting company „Stereo Plus", the main activities of which are the organization and production of TV and Radio broadcasting, the creation and operation of broadcasting and communication networks. Since its foundation, the company has been assisting many TV stations in broadcasting the signal.

Since 2021, January up to present he is a Member of Parliament of the 10th convocation. Since 2021, June up to present David Zilpimiani is a Deputy Chairperson of the Foreign Relations Committee and Since the same year, 2021, June up to present, he is a Member of the Education and Science Committee.

David zilpimiani published 108 International scientific papers. Also he is a co-author of 4 International Space projects and 1 International patent

References 

Living people
Tbilisi State University alumni
Members of the Parliament of Georgia
Academic staff of the National and Kapodistrian University of Athens
Academic staff of the Sapienza University of Rome
Year of birth missing (living people)